Arachnothryx chimboracensis is a species of flowering plant in the family Rubiaceae. It is endemic to Ecuador.

References

Endemic flora of Ecuador
Guettardeae
Critically endangered plants
Taxonomy articles created by Polbot
Plants described in 1931